Expedition 26 was the 26th  long-duration mission to the International Space Station. The expedition's first three crew members – one US astronaut and two Russian cosmonauts – arrived at the station on board Soyuz TMA-01M on 10 October 2010. Expedition 26 officially began the following month on 26 November, when half of the crew of the previous mission, Expedition 25, returned to Earth on board Soyuz TMA-19. The rest of the Expedition 26 crew – one US astronaut, one Russian cosmonaut and one ESA astronaut – joined the trio already on board when their spacecraft, Soyuz TMA-20, docked with the station on 17 December 2010.

The commander of Expedition 25, Douglas Wheelock, handed over command of the station to Expedition 26 commander Scott Kelly on 24 November 2010. The 26 crew was joined by the crew of STS-133 on 26 February 2011, and was supplied by the ESA's Johannes Kepler unmanned resupply craft, which arrived on 24 February. Expedition 26 ended on 16 March 2011 with the departure of Soyuz TMA-01M.



Crew 

Source NASA

Backup crew 
  Ronald Garan, for Kelly
  Sergey Volkov, for Kaleri
  Oleg Kononenko, for Skripochka
  Anatoli Ivanishin, for Kondratyev
  Michael Fossum, for Coleman
  Satoshi Furukawa, for Nespoli

MagISStra
ESA astronaut Paolo Nespoli's mission to the space station was named MagISStra. The name combines the word magistra, meaning "female teacher" in Latin, with the acronym "ISS", as suggested by Antonella Pezzani of Italy.

Spacewalks
Two Russian spacewalks were scheduled for Expedition 26. The first, Russian EVA-27, was conducted Friday, 21 January 2011. The second spacewalk, Russian EVA-28, was conducted on the date of 16 February 2011. Cosmonauts Oleg Skripochka and Dmitri Kondratyev conducted both spacewalks.

Gallery

References

External links 

 NASA's Space Station Expeditions page
 Expedition 26 photography

Expeditions to the International Space Station
2010 in spaceflight
2011 in spaceflight